Natalia Galibarenko (born 1978 in Kyiv, Soviet Union) is a Ukrainian diplomat, and a former Ukrainian Ambassador Extraordinary and Plenipotentiary to the UK.

Education 
Natalia Galibarenko graduated from Taras Shevchenko National University of Kyiv, master's degree in International Relations; Languages: English and Spanish.

Career 
From 2000 – Attaché, Third Secretary of the Cabinet of the Minister for Foreign Affairs of Ukraine, Third and Second Secretary of the Mission of Ukraine to the European Union.

2006-2007 – Chief Consultant of the Main Office for Foreign Policy, European and Euro-Atlantic Integration Processes of the Presidential Administration of Ukraine.

2007-2009 – Head of Section for Deputy Minister for Foreign Affairs of Ukraine.

2009-2012 – Head of Division, Deputy Director of the Directorate General – Head of Division for Co-operation in Political, Security and Defence Fields of the EU Directorate General, Ministry of Foreign Affairs of Ukraine.

2012-2014 – Deputy Head of the Permanent Mission of Ukraine to the International Organizations in Vienna.

2014-2015 – First Deputy Minister for Foreign Affairs of Ukraine. She participated in numerous bilateral and multilateral negotiations  of Ukraine, including in framework of the EU, Council of Europe, OSCE and other international organizations.

From 2015 — Ambassador Extraordinary and Plenipotentiary of Ukraine to the United Kingdom of Great Britain and Northern Ireland, Permanent Representative to the IMO. Vadym Prystaiko was appointed as her successor by President Volodymyr Zelensky on 20 July 2020.

References

External links
 Embassy of Ukraine to the United Kingdom of Great Britain and Northern Ireland
 Ukraine is strengthening ties with Britain: Here's how....
 Meeting of David Bakradze with Natalia Galibarenko
 A Conversation with NATALIA GALIBARENKO

Living people
1978 births
Diplomats from Kyiv
Ambassadors of Ukraine to the United Kingdom
Ukrainian women diplomats
Government ministers of Ukraine
Taras Shevchenko National University of Kyiv, Institute of International Relations alumni
Ukrainian women ambassadors
Women government ministers of Ukraine